George Floyd Square may refer to:

 George Floyd Square, the memorialized section of street in Minneapolis
 George Floyd Square occupied protest, the former semi-autonomous zone

See also 
 George Floyd (disambiguation)
 George Floyd memorial (disambiguation)